Mostów  is a village in the administrative district of Gmina Huszlew, within Łosice County, Masovian Voivodeship, in east-central Poland.

References

Villages in Łosice County